The Minister of Public Works and Infrastructure (formerly the Ministry of Public Works) is the minister of the South African government with political responsibility for South Africa's Department of Public Works. The current minister is Sihle Zikalala, who was appointed by President Cyril Ramaphosa on 6 March 2023.

The ministry was created after the creation of the Union of South Africa as a British dominion in 1910.

Ministers of Public Works

References

Public Works